Scarpantina is a genus of planthoppers in the family Flatidae. It was first described by Leopold Melichar in 1901.

References 

Flatidae
Auchenorrhyncha genera